"Broken" (stylized in all lowercase) is a song by the American indie pop band Lovelytheband, released exclusively to Billboard on April 13, 2017. The song was later included on the band's debut album, Finding It Hard to Smile (2018).

"Broken" was the band's breakout hit, spending nine weeks at number one on the Billboards Alternative Songs chart and reaching number 29 on the Billboard Hot 100. The song held the record for longest running entry on the Alternative Songs chart, at 76 weeks, eclipsing the 65 week run of "Savior" by Rise Against, until it was passed by the chart run of "Monsters" by All Time Low.

Background
Vocalist Mitchy Collins described the background of the song saying: "We all have our demons we fight every day. It's about finding someone whose problems complement yours. Perfectly imperfect. Everyone is a little broken inside, trying to find their band aid". He also explained the song by saying "This song is about finding someone who is just as fucked up and lost as you are, but somehow you make it work together. Everyone is a little bit broken inside, nobody's perfect. This song is an ode to the broken ones". Collins wrote the song when he was undergoing a difficult point in his life, soon after he split with Danielle Bouchard in his former band Oh Honey and after a heartbreak.

Song description
The song takes place in "some trust fund baby's Brooklyn loft". It describes a narrator who meets an unknown woman at a party, and both discover they are broken, which opens them up emotionally.

Music video
The music video, released in September 2017, opens with Mitchy Collins saying: "Life is funny like that, when the dust settles at the end of the day–and we've said all we can, we'll realize every part of us, even the loving ones, were a little broken". The video shows Collins meeting a blonde woman (played by Skylar Benton) at a party and cuts away to fantasies in which he imagines his life with her.

Critical reception
The song was given positive reviews. Atwood magazine said, "For all its theatrics, lovely.the.band's debut satisfies an essential part of our complex emotional diet". Music Existence wrote, ""broken" is a bouncy, synth-pop dream of song that winds melancholy lyrics with an infectiously cheerful tune. The song has everything to make it a hit..." Stereogum described the song as a "chirpy tune about the prospect of love between two deeply damaged people. Replete with gang vocals, a rhythm fit for drunken swaying, and a keyboard riff that echoes back to MGMT's "Kids"..."

The song is featured in the season 4 preview video for television series ‘Catastrophe’ starring Rob Delaney and Sharon Horgan.

Charts

Weekly charts

Year-end charts

Decade-end charts

Certifications

References

2017 singles
2017 songs
Lovelytheband songs
Songs about loneliness
Another Century Records singles
Century Media Records singles
RED Distribution singles
American synth-pop songs
Songs containing the I–V-vi-IV progression